is a Japanese football player. She plays for Mynavi Vegalta Sendai. She played for the Japan women's national football team.

Club career
Arimachi was born in Sakai, Fukui on July 12, 1988. After graduating from high school, she joined Ohara Gakuen JaSRA in 2007. In 2008, she moved to Okayama Yunogo Belle. In 2015, she moved to Vegalta Sendai (later Mynavi Vegalta Sendai).

National team career
In November 2008, Arimachi was selected Japan U-20 national team for 2008 U-20 World Cup. On September 22, 2013, she first played for Japan national team against Nigeria. She played six games for Japan until 2016.

National team statistics

References

External links

Japan Football Association

1988 births
Living people
People from Sakai, Fukui
Association football people from Fukui Prefecture
Japanese women's footballers
Japan women's international footballers
Nadeshiko League players
AC Nagano Parceiro Ladies players
Okayama Yunogo Belle players
Mynavi Vegalta Sendai Ladies players
Women's association football forwards